Monterrubio de la Demanda is a municipality and village located in the province of Burgos, Castile and León, Spain.

Demography
According to the 2004 census (INE), the municipality had a population of 100 inhabitants. By 2018 the population had declined to 59.

References

External links
Monterrubio de la Demanda

Municipalities in the Province of Burgos